Union is an unincorporated community in Clark County, in the U.S. state of Missouri.

Union was laid out in 1855.

References

Unincorporated communities in Clark County, Missouri
Unincorporated communities in Missouri